Fourth Floor Collapse is a Melbourne-based rock band.

History
Fourth Floor Collapse originated in the northern suburbs of Perth, Western Australia, playing their first show at the Rosemount Hotel in 1998. They became the most awarded unsigned band in Australia, taking out the Next Big Thing Competition in 1999 and winning ten Western Australian Music Industry Awards, including Most Popular Local Original Rock Act (2002). The band released its debut recording Plans for Dream Homes in 2000 on the QStik Records label and its debut album, Half Deserted Streets in 2001 on Congregation Records.

In 2003 Fourth Floor Collapse released its second album, From the Cold, for which it received extensive airplay on Triple J and public radio around the country, with tracks such as "Made Believe", "Sun", and "Stories Unglued".

Frustrated by the isolation of Perth the three main songwriters, Dan Forrestal, Rhys Kealley and Michael Miller relocated to Melbourne in 2005 adding bass player, Jesse Delaney and drummer Michael Parker. The group signed to Creative Vibes with whom they recorded and released their third album Books with Broken Spines in 2006. Singles released from this album were, "Drink 'til You Drown", "Occupation" and "Ashes". The release was followed by heavy touring by the band and by the beginning of 2008 they had clocked up over 250 shows. They commenced recording their fourth album in early 2008.    The album, Victoria, was recorded in Melbourne; mixed in Perth by Andy Lawson (Little Birdy, Eskimo Joe & End of Fashion) and Joel Quartermain (Eskimo Joe); and mastered in Sydney, it was released on 13 October 2008.

Members
 Nigel Bird — drums (??)
 Jesse Delaney — bass (2005–present)
 Dan Forrestal — guitar, mandolin, piano, vocals (1998–present)
 Nathan Gaunt — bass (2003)
 Rhys Kealley — guitar, piano, melodica, vocals (1998–present)
 Russell Loasby — drums (2004)
 Trent McKenzie — bass (2006)
 Leigh Miller — bass (2003–2004)
 Michael Miller — lead vocal, acoustic guitar, piano (1998–present)
 Scott Mesiti — bass (2005)
 Scott O'Donoghue — bass, keyboards (1998–2003)
 Michael Parker — drums (2005–present)
 Sean Pollard — bass (2004)
 Mike Rouse — drums (1998–2004)
 Anto Smyth — drums (2004)

Discography

Albums

EPs

Singles

Awards and nominations

WAM Song of the Year
The WAM Song of the Year was formed by the  Western Australian Rock Music Industry Association Inc. (WARMIA) in 1985, with its main aim to develop and run annual awards recognising achievements within the music industry in Western Australia.
 

|-
| 2001
| 
| Pop Song of the Year
| 
|-

Western Australian Music Industry Awards
The Western Australian Music Industry Awards (commonly known as WAMis) are annual awards presented to the local contemporary music industry, put on by the Western Australian Music Industry Association Inc (WAM). Fourth Floor Collapse won five awards.

 (wins only)
|-
|rowspan="4"| 2001
| Half Deserted Streets
| Most Popular Local Original Recorded Release
| 
|-
|rowspan="2"| Fourth Floor Collapse
| Most Popular Local Original Band Website
| 
|-
| Most Popular Original Rock Act
| 
|-
| Michael Miller (Fourth Floor Collapse)
| Most Popular Male Original Vocalist 
| 
|-
| 2002
| Fourth Floor Collapse
| Most Popular Original Rock Act
| 
|-

References

External links
 Official website

Australian indie rock groups
Western Australian musical groups
Musical groups established in 1998